Kannum Kannum is a 2008 Tamil language film directed by G. Marimuthu, who also wrote the story, screenplay and dialogues. Prasanna plays the leading role, and Udhayathara pairs with him, while Vadivelu, Santhanam, and Vijayakumar play supporting roles. The film's score and soundtrack is composed by Dhina, with lyrics by "Kavi Perarasu" Vairamuthu. It premièred on Kalaignar TV as part of their Gandhi Jayanthi Special Programmes on  2 October 2008.

Plot
Sathyamoorthy (Prasanna), an orphan, vents his feelings in a poem but does not submit it to a magazine. Surprisingly, he reads a poem penned by a girl in a magazine that is quite similar to what he has written. He is amused and sets off to find the girl. He finds that she is a college student and living in Kutralam. He writes a letter and gets a reply. The friendship develops, and it gradually evolves into love.

One fine day, Sathyamoorthy goes to Kutralam to meet the girl and stays in his friend's house. The girl is away on a college tour. Ironically, she is the sister of his friend. In the second half, the friend dies in a mishap accidentally caused by Sathyamoorthy. Wishing to atone for his fault, he takes on his friend's responsibilities and considers his friend's sisters as his own sisters. When the girl comes back, she finds a new brother, who is supposed to be her lover. She is opposed to Sathyamoorthy since she thought it was totally his fault until she realizes why he has come to Kutralam. This is followed by an emotional resolution of their love.

The subplot follows Vadivelu as Udumban, whose antics are one of the highlights in the movie, especially the "Kenatha Kaanom" scene. A reference to the scene is made in the 2009 film Kanthaswamy.

Cast

Soundtrack
The music was composed by Dhina.

Critical reception
Rediff wrote "Stories are often touted in Kollywood as 'different,', 'blowing your mind,' and tons of other catchphrases but, more often than not, they fail to live up to expectations. M R Mohan Radha's Kannum Kannum, directed by G Marimuthu, offers to be a story 'that might happen to anyone' and actually does manage to fulfill that promise." B. Balaji wrote "Kannum Kannum director Marimuthu falls in this category. With likeable characters and an emotional story, he fashions a good romance that earns our admiration before making us lose our patience towards the end." Behindwoods wrote "Kannum Kannum joins that league of rare films that have shown that love can be selfless. A beautifully made, silent love story full of innocence. A whiff of fresh air amidst the rush of popcorn romances". Sify wrote "Marimuthu's beautifully crafted touching love story laced with family sentiments, continue to haunt you long after the film is over. It's a triumph of his script writing methods and packaging that makes the film work big time". The Hindu wrote "Well-made and sensitive, but let down by an unsatisfactory conclusion."

References

External links
 

2008 films
2000s Tamil-language films
Indian drama films
2008 directorial debut films